Porphyromonas pasteri  is a Gram-negative, obligately anaerobic, non-spore-forming and non-motile bacterium from the genus of Porphyromonas which has been isolated from the human saliva. Porphyromonas pasteri is associated with periodontitis, a disease that can lead to tooth loss, and has also been linked to other systemic diseases such as cardiovascular disease, rheumatoid arthritis, and certain cancers.

References

External links 
Type strain of Porphyromonas pasteri at BacDive -  the Bacterial Diversity Metadatabase

Bacteroidia
Bacteria described in 2015